Quiviger or Kivijer is a surname, and may refer to;

Quiviger derives from kivijer which means 'tanner' in Breton.

 Pascale Quiviger (born 1969), Canadian writer
 Pierre-Yves Quiviger, French philosopher

Breton-language surnames